The Macau national under-23 football team represents Macau in international football competitions in the Asian Games, the East Asian Games, as well as any other under-23 international football tournaments. It is controlled by the Macau Football Association.

Competitive record

AFC U-23 Championship Record

East Asian Games

External links
  Official website
 Soccerway profile

U23
Asian national under-23 association football teams